The family Cisticolidae is a group of about 160 warblers, small passerine birds found mainly in warmer southern regions of the Old World. They were formerly included within the Old World warbler family Sylviidae.

This family probably originated in Africa, which has the majority of species, but there are representatives of the family across tropical Asia into Australasia, and one species, the zitting cisticola, breeds in Europe.

These are generally very small birds of drab brown or grey appearance found in open country such as grassland or scrub. They are often difficult to see and many species are similar in appearance, so the song is often the best identification guide. These are insectivorous birds which nest low in vegetation.

Taxonomy
The family was introduced (as Cisticolinae) by the Swedish zoologist Carl Jakob Sundevall in 1872.

Many taxonomists place the red-winged prinia and the red-fronted prinia in the genus Prinia rather than in their own monotypic genera.
Support for their placement in Prinia is provided by a molecular phylogenetic study of the Cisticolidae published in 2013 that found that both species were closely related to the prinias.

List of genera
The family contains 168 species divided into 26 genera: For more detail, see List of Cisticolidae species.
 Neomixis, jeries (3 species) (genus is basal to all other Cisticolidae)
 Cisticola, cisticolas (53 species)
 Incana – monotypic, Socotra warbler (Incana incanus)
 Prinia, prinias (30 species)
 Schistolais (2 species)
 Phragmacia – monotypic, Namaqua warbler (Phragmacia substriata)
 Oreophilais – monotypic, Roberts's warbler (Oreophilais robertsi)

 Micromacronus (2 species)
 Urolais – monotypic, green longtail (Urolais epichlora)
 Oreolais, (2 species) – moved here from Apalis
 Drymocichla – monotypic, red-winged grey warbler (Drymocichla incana)
 Spiloptila – monotypic, cricket warbler (Spiloptila clamans)
 Phyllolais – monotypic, buff-bellied warbler (Phyllolais pulchella)
 Apalis, apalises (25 species)
 Malcorus – monotypic, rufous-eared warbler (Malcorus pectoralis)
 Hypergerus – monotypic, oriole warbler (Hypergerus atriceps)
 Eminia – monotypic, grey-capped warbler (Eminia lepida)
 Camaroptera (5 species)
 Calamonastes (4 species)
 Euryptila – monotypic, cinnamon-breasted warbler (Euryptila subcinnamomea)
 Bathmocercus, rufous warblers (2 species)
 Scepomycter (2 species) - sometimes merged into Bathmocercus
 Orthotomus, tailorbirds (13 species)
 Artisornis (2 species)
 Poliolais – monotypic, white-tailed warbler (Poliolais lopezi)
 Eremomela (11 species)

References

Further reading

Cibois, A., Slikas, B., Schulenberg, T. S., & Pasquet, E. (2001). An endemic radiation of Malagasy songbirds is revealed by mitochondrial DNA sequence data. Evolution 55 (6): 1198–1206. DOI:10.1554/0014-3820(2001)055[1198:AEROMS]2.0.CO;2 PDF
Ryan, Peter (2006). Family Cisticolidae (Cisticolas and allies). Pp. 378–492 in del Hoyo J., Elliott A. & Christie D.A. (2006) Handbook of the Birds of the World. Volume 11. Old World Flycatchers to Old World Warblers Lynx Edicions, Barcelona 
Urban, E.K.; Fry, C.H. & Keith, S. (1997) The Birds of Africa, vol. 5. Academic Press, London.

External links

 Cisticolidae videos on the Internet Bird Collection

 
Bird families